Debendra Prasad "Deba" Singh (born 1943) is a former Indian footballer who played as a defender for Orissa and the India national team.

Personal life
He is the father of former Indian international footballer Rajendra Prasad Singh. Singh received the first OSJA (Odisha Sports Journalists’ Association) awards in 2018.

Club career
He played for Orissa Police in the Cuttack Senior League domestically. Singh was part of the Orissa team which was coached by Amal Dutta and captained the squad that reached the semi-finals in the 1967–68 edition of the Santosh Trophy by defeating Andhra Pradesh.

International career
Singh made his senior national team debut in his only appearance against Myanmar in an international friendly.

References

Living people
1943 births
People from Cuttack
Footballers from Odisha
Indian footballers
India international footballers
Association football defenders